All American Aircraft Inc was an aircraft manufacturer established in 1945 at Long Beach, California by Ernest and Gerald Adler. The firm built prototypes of a light plane design by Ernest, the Ensign, but was unable to find buyers to make mass production viable.

References
 
 aerofiles.com

Defunct aircraft manufacturers of the United States
Companies based in Long Beach, California